is the fifth and final installment in Sega's Virtua Fighter series of arcade fighting games. The original version was released on the Sega Lindbergh arcade system board. The first location tests took place on November 26, 2005  leading to the official release on July 12, 2006, in Japanese arcades. An export version, based on Version B, was released to arcades outside of Japan in February 2007.

The revised Version B update was released in Japanese arcades in December 2006 and was ported to the PlayStation 3, for which it was released February 2007 and was a launch title for the console's European release in March 2007. Version C was released in Japanese arcades in July 2007 and was ported to the Xbox 360, for which it was released October 2007 in Europe and in North America. The Xbox 360 version would allow users to compete online via Xbox Live, a feature that was not available on the PlayStation 3 version. While Japanese arcade received the first major update Virtua Fighter 5 R, the Xbox 360, PlayStation 3 and arcades would get the second update Virtua Fighter 5 Final Showdown.

An enhanced remaster of Final Showdown, titled Virtua Fighter 5 Ultimate Showdown was released worldwide for PlayStation 4 on June 1, 2021, and Japanese arcades on June 2, 2021.

Gameplay
Throw speed has been reduced, from 8 frames to 12 frames. In addition, "Instant", or 0-frame throws re-appear from Virtua Fighter 3 in guaranteed throw situations (such as during an evade).
Each stages’ rings have different shapes, weights and heights, rather than restrictedly square, nor have same ring size, as well as not all stages that have walls are at a same fence. Semi-open walls is not featured, but is replaced with single wall on certain stages.
To encourage a more "moral" style of play, Sega introduced the Clash System: when initiated with the right timing, an attack can be canceled out with a throw, creating a clash and leaving both players at +0 frame advantage (neutral).
Offensive Move: pressing Punch + Kick + Guard during an evade will initiate an angled forward dash. In addition, pressing Punch or Kick during OM will initiate an attack which can lead to side or back stagger or crumple, leading to a guaranteed combo opportunity.
The Xbox 360 version introduced online support via Xbox Live, which allowed two players from around the world to battle over the Internet. Developers have also suggested that the PS3 version could also be online-enabled in the form of a downloadable patch. This was later discounted by Sega's Jay Boor who told : "at this time SEGA has no plans to release a patch for the PS3 version of Virtua Fighter 5."
Version C of Virtua Fighter 5 was used for the 360 version which fixed up some gameplay issues, while the PS3 version used version B.
Different items are available in the Xbox 360 port of the game in Quest mode, as it is based upon Version C.
On January 16, 2008, the Xbox 360 version received an update, which made improvements and changes to online play and quest mode.

Plot

All of the invitations for the Fifth World Fighting Tournament have been sent. And now, the 17 best fighters in the world begin their final phases of preparation. They must learn from their past mistakes and perfect every aspect of their mind, body, and soul - for there is no room for mistakes in this competition. Most of them are unaware that J6, the organization funding the tournament, has even more sinister ulterior motives for the contest and the syndicate's top secret Dural program is already underway. In the organization's quest for world domination, the scientists at J6 are creating the ultimate fighting machine with human features. The said Dural whom Kage-Maru fought and defeated in the Fourth World Fighting Tournament was not his mother, Tsukikage, leading J6 to kidnap Vanessa to further their mass production on the Dural project. She was able to escape with the help of an insider, but not before they captured her combat data and transferred it to the new advanced Dural model named V-Dural.

J6 is determined to find out the traitor that released Vanessa and see if V-Dural is ready to defeat the world's best fighters. Along the way, other than sending their Japanese judoka, Goh Hinogami to participate once again, J6 also deploys their Japanese-French karateka, Jean Kujo, who was once Lion Rafale's childhood friend and rival to enter there too. The Fifth World Fighting Tournament will reveal both.

Characters

Returning characters
Akira Yuki
Pai Chan
Lau Chan
Wolf Hawkfield
Jeffry McWild
Kage-Maru
Sarah Bryant
Jacky Bryant
Shun Di
Lion Rafale
Aoi Umenokoji
Taka-Arashi (Virtua Fighter 5 R/Final Showdown/Ultimate Showdown only)
Lei-Fei
Vanessa Lewis
Brad Burns
Goh Hinogami
Dural (NPC in Virtua Fighter 5 Ultimate Showdown)

New characters
Eileen
El Blaze
Jean Kujo (Virtua Fighter 5 R/Final Showdown/Ultimate Showdown only)

Versions

PlayStation 3 version
The PlayStation 3 port is based around the older Version B revision.  On January 16, 2008, Sega confirmed online features will not be added to the PlayStation 3 version due to the Version B's technical limitations.

Xbox 360 version
The Xbox 360 port of Virtua Fighter 5, known as Virtua Fighter 5 Online in North America and Virtua Fighter 5 Live Arena in Japan, benefits from the additions and refinements that have been made to the Version C arcade revision, including online play and an online update ability.

Virtua Fighter 5 R
On February 14, 2008, at the AOU Amusement Expo, Sega AM2 announced a revision to Virtua Fighter 5 known as Virtua Fighter 5 R.  This new version was released for the Arcades on July 24, 2008, and features brand new stages as well as a new character named Jean Kujo, who practices Karate.  The sumo wrestler Taka-Arashi also returns, making his first appearance since Virtua Fighter 3 and bringing the fighter count up to 20 (counting Dural).

Version B of Virtua Fighter 5 R was officially released in the Japanese arcades on May 21, 2009. This version featured changes in the animations of moves on all the characters, as well as changes to enhance the gameplay modes, and an improved camera system.

Version C was released on November 25, 2009. However, this particular version mainly added new team items for the character's outfits.

Virtua Fighter 5 Final Showdown
On February 18, 2010, Sega released a trailer for a second and final revision called Virtua Fighter 5 Final Showdown. This update for the Sega Lindbergh arcade system debuted at the 2010 AOU Expo, and features new character costumes and new animations. The game was officially released in Japanese arcades on July 29, 2010.  Version A of Final Showdown was released on April 20, 2011, at the Japanese arcades. It was announced at Gamescom 2011 that Final Showdown would be coming to PlayStation 3 on June 5, 2012, and Xbox 360 on June 6, 2012, complete with online play for both platforms. The game was released in digital format. Within a week, Final Showdown surpassed Japanese Sale Goals expectations.

Version B of Final Showdown was released on March 25, 2015, at the Japanese arcades, and removes Internet functionality. This version of the game is playable at the in-game arcades in several of the Yakuza games, including Yakuza 6, Judgment, and Yakuza: Like a Dragon.

The Xbox 360 version of Final Showdown was later made available on Xbox One on September 15, 2016, via backwards compatibility, also becoming available on Xbox Series X/S.

Virtua Fighter 5 Ultimate Showdown
An enhanced remaster of the game, titled Virtua Fighter 5 Ultimate Showdown, also known in Japan as Virtua Fighter esports, was teased at Tokyo Game Show 2020 Online in September 2020 as Virtua Fighter x esports Project and announced in May 2021, in celebration of Sega's 60th anniversary. Co-developed by Ryu Ga Gotoku Studio and Sega AM2, this version features updated graphics, using the Dragon Engine, new background music, new user interface, new opening cinematic, and new online features. It was released worldwide exclusively for PlayStation 4 on June 1, 2021.

Ultimate Showdown also offers downloadable content in the form of the "Legendary Pack", which includes all background music tracks from the previous Virtua Fighter games; various costumes and items for character customization; and cosmetic options based on the original Virtua Fighter, including alternate lifebar UI graphics, Jacky's classic stage and low-polygon 3D models for each character. The three last costume sets from the previous versions are missing, and Dural is both a non-player character boss and cannot be unlocked at the initial release, but will be available as post-launch downloadable contents on each next months or years, excluding in third-party costume packs. As part of co-development with Ryu Ga Gotoku Studio, Yakuza-themed costumes and musics, including the arrangement music of Virtua Fighter 3 were announced on December 4, 2021, and released on December 8, 2021. The costumes, UI lifebar graphics and musics from Tekken series (mainly from Tekken 7) was announced on March 20, 2022 after Virtua Fighter’s Challenge Cup Season 0.

Reception

The game got to number 7 in the UK sales chart. The game received significant critical acclaim from most reviewers. In 2009, Edge ranked the game #24 on its list of "The 100 Best Games To Play Today" (the highest-rated 3D fighter on the list), stating "One of gaming's great myths is that VF is inaccessible to all but the initiated. It takes care of frame-counting junkies, of course, but the core of AM2's series is a beautiful balance of attack, block and counter-attack that anyone can enjoy. Each new entry refines, making that solid animation even more seamless and introducing new characters that seem like they were always there."

Final Showdown received a 9/10 from Eurogamer, which called it "deeper than any of its peers." Edge favorably compared Final Showdown with Street Fighter IV, Marvel vs. Capcom 3, Soulcalibur V, and Mortal Kombat, noting "Its prudence, that veil of simplicity masking a system of astonishing possibility and depth, makes it one of the purest fighting games on the market today." The game was featured in 1001 Video Games You Must Play Before You Die, with journalist Richard Stanton stating "No matter how good the latest Street Fighter or Tekken is, they'll still be undisciplined teenagers compared to Virtua Fighters cool, mature mastery of fighting."

Notes

References

External links
North American official website
Japanese official website

2006 video games
Arcade video games
Esports games
Fighting games used at the Super Battle Opera tournament
PlayStation 3 games
PlayStation 4 games
PlayStation Network games
Sega-AM2 games
Sega arcade games
Fighting games used at the Evolution Championship Series tournament
Video games developed in Japan
Video games with alternative versions
Virtua Fighter
Xbox 360 games
Xbox 360 Live Arcade games